Crescent is an unincorporated community in Latah County, in the U.S. state of Idaho.

History
A post office called Crescent was established in 1895, and remained in operation until it was discontinued in 1930. The community reportedly once had a bedbug problem so severe, the also infested church was known locally as "Bedbug Church".

Crescent's population was 47 in 1909.

References

Unincorporated communities in Latah County, Idaho
Unincorporated communities in Idaho